This is a list of films produced in France in 1988.

Notes

External links
 1988 in France
 French films of 1988 at the Internet Movie Database
French films of 1988 at Cinema-francais.fr

1988
Films
Lists of 1988 films by country or language